Kateryna Zelenykh is a Ukrainian freestyle wrestler. She won one of the bronze medals in the women's 59 kg event at the 2020 Individual Wrestling World Cup held in Belgrade, Serbia.

At the 2021 U23 World Wrestling Championships held in Belgrade, Serbia, she won the silver medal in the 62 kg event. She won one of the bronze medals in the 65kg event at the 2022 U23 World Wrestling Championships held in Pontevedra, Spain.

References

External links 
 

Living people
Year of birth missing (living people)
Place of birth missing (living people)
Ukrainian female sport wrestlers
21st-century Ukrainian women